Xavier O'Neill (born 3 August 2000) is an Australian rules footballer who plays for the West Coast Eagles in the Australian Football League (AFL). He was recruited by the West Coast Eagles with the 28th draft pick in the 2018 AFL draft.

Early football
O'Neill played junior football for the Blackburn Football Club in the Eastern Football League. O'Neill also played football for his school, Whitefriars College. He played for the Oakleigh Chargers in the NAB League. Over the two seasons O'Neill played for the Chargers in 2017 and 2018, he played 35 games, kicked 11 goals, and averaged 18.5 disposals a game. He was also named in the NAB AFL All Stars team, playing for team 'Harvey' in the Under 17s.

AFL career
On debut, O'Neill kicked 1 goal, while also collecting 10 disposals, 1 mark and 4 tackles.

Statistics
Statistics are correct to round 2, 2021

|- style="background-color: #eaeaea"
! scope="row" style="text-align:center" | 2019
|  || 24 || 0 || — || — || — || — || — || — || — || — || — || — || — || — || — || —
|-
| scope="row" text-align:center | 2020
| 
| 24 || 5 || 1 || 1 || 25 || 24 || 49 || 9 || 9 || 0.2 || 0.2 || 5.0 || 4.8 || 9.8 || 1.8 || 1.8
|- style="background-color: #eaeaea"
! scope="row" style="text-align:center" | 2021
|  || 24 || 2 || 0 || 0 || 17 || 13 || 30 || 4 || 3 || 0.0 || 0.0 || 8.5 || 6.5 || 15.0 || 2.0 || 1.5
|- style="background:#EAEAEA; font-weight:bold; width:2em"
| scope="row" text-align:center class="sortbottom" colspan=3 | Career
| 7
| 1
| 1
| 42
| 37
| 79
| 13
| 12
| 0.1
| 0.1
| 6.0
| 5.3
| 11.3
| 1.9
| 1.7
|}

References

External links 

2000 births
Living people
West Coast Eagles players
Australian rules footballers from Melbourne
Oakleigh Chargers players
Sportsmen from Victoria (Australia)
West Coast Eagles (WAFL) players
People from Blackburn, Victoria